Amanikhareqerem was a King of Kush who ruled towards during the 1st century AD. In older research he was placed into the 2nd century AD. or possibly earlier.

Until recently not much was known about Amanikhareqerem. His name only appeared on two ram figures and an object found at Napata.

Welsby places Amanikhareqerem after King Aritenyesbokhe and before King Teritedakhatey.

In recent years new excavations at Naqa provided more evidence for him. In 1998, a sandstone medallion with his name was found and recently a temple decoration with his name was excavated at the same place.

References

External links
"Meroitic Palaeography as a Tool for Chronology: Prospects and Limits"
Claude Rilly, « Le royaume de Méroé », Afriques (En ligne), Varia posted online April 21, 2010, accessed June 2, 2010.

1st-century monarchs of Kush
2nd-century monarchs of Kush
1st-century monarchs in Africa